was a Japanese samurai who served Oda Nobunaga. He was given Kameyama (200,000 koku) in Tanba Province.

Samurai
Year of birth missing
Year of death missing
Naitō clan